The Embassy of Afghanistan in Moscow (Persian: سفارت کبرای جمهوری اسلامی افغانستان در مسكو/ Pashto:په مسکو کې د افغانستان د اسلامي جمهوریت لوی سفارت) is the diplomatic mission of the Islamic Emirate of Afghanistan to the Russian Federation. It is located at 42 Povarskaya Street in the Arbat district of Moscow. Following the fall of the country to the Taliban in August 2021, the embassy remained in operation as a representative of the Islamic Republic, until the Russian Ministry of Foreign Affairs accredited Taliban appointee Jamal Nasir Gharwal as charge d'affaires on 9 April 2022.

The mission is housed in historical Ponizovsky House, designed by Lev Kekushev, although its exterior was later radically altered and does not display signs of Kekushev's Art Nouveau style.

In 1902 Jacob Reck's development company purchased a large Volchkov estate, split it in two lots, and invited Kekushev to design two luxury mansions for resale. The better known Mindovsky House (present-day Embassy of New Zealand) was set right on the street corner, with the main entrance facing the spacious inner courtyard. Ponizovsky House was set back from Povarskaya street line, allowing a narrow strip of garden between the wall and sidewalk; its main entrance faces the corner of Povarskaya Street and Skatertny Lane. Period photographs show that the building had a flattened yet prominent dome above the main entrance and a smaller curvilinear gable above Povarskaya street facade; overall styling was reserved, with clear vertical lines of windows cut through a tiled wall. In 1914, when Kekushev was already inactive, Ponizovsky House was rebuilt to a neoclassical design, losing the dome and all original exterior finishes.

See also 
 Afghanistan–Russia relations
 Diplomatic missions in Russia

References 

Houses completed in 1903
Houses in Russia
Art Nouveau architecture in Moscow
Art Nouveau houses
Afghanistan–Russia relations
Diplomatic missions of Afghanistan
Diplomatic missions in Moscow
Afghanistan–Soviet Union relations
Cultural heritage monuments of regional significance in Moscow